Billy is a fictional character from the Black Christmas film series. He first appeared in Black Christmas (1974), as a deranged murderer who taunts and kills a group of college students during the Christmas season. Created by Bob Clark and A. Roy Moore, the character was partly inspired by the urban legend "The Babysitter and the Man Upstairs", as well as a series of real murders in Montreal during the 1943 holiday season.

Several members of the cast and crew would portray and voice the character in the original film, such as Nick Mancuso, who performed the voices for the phone calls, while cameraman Albert J. Dunk performed Billy's POV shots and director Clark portrays both the villain's shadow and the phone voices. Neither the character nor his portrayers would be listed in the end credits. In the years following the original film's release, fans and media outlets have often cited the character's name as Billy, and director Clark has himself referred to the character by that name in interviews.

Unlike later slasher film antagonists, the character's true identity and motivations were intentionally omitted from the 1974 version  of the film, which the filmmakers felt made him more frightening. Critics and art historians have noted that by leaving the character enigmatic, it allowed the audience to place their own fears onto the character, forming their own ideas about him and his motivations. While largely overshadowed by more popular horror or slasher film villains, Billy has also been identified by some critics and film historians as establishing many of the tropes that later became a staple of the slasher film genre, predating John Carpenter's Halloween (1978). He has been described as one of the greatest horror villains of all time, and has been referenced in several other entertainment media.

Appearances 
Billy made his first appearance in the original 1974 film Black Christmas as a mentally disturbed man known as "The Moaner", who regularly calls a local sorority house, leaving disturbing and obscene messages. During one such phone call, Barb (Margot Kidder), one of the sorority sisters, provokes him; he responds by threatening to kill them. The caller then goes on a killing spree, murdering most of the sorority house's inhabitants, including Barb. Jess (Olivia Hussey), the lone survivor, is attacked by Billy but manages to fight him off, and after discovering the corpses of Billy's victims in Barb's room, accidentally bludgeons her boyfriend Peter (Keir Dullea) to death, thinking he is the killer. The film ends with Billy, still alive, talking to the corpses in the attic, before making a final phone call to the house.

Billy later appeared in the 1976 novelization of the film written by Campbell Armstrong under the pseudonyms Lee Hays and the 1983 republished edition as Thomas Altman. Both editions gave the character's name as Billy. Following Moore's original draft, the novelization expands upon Billy's ramblings and other key sequences that were cut in subsequent rewrites.

In the 2006 remake, his full name is William "Billy" Edward Lenz (Cainan Wiebe), and his backstory is prominently featured. Billy was born with severe jaundice due to liver disease, he is physically and emotionally abused as a child by his mother, Constance (Karin Konoval). After murdering Billy's father along with her lover, Constance rapes Billy after she is unable to conceive a child with her lover, giving birth to Billy's sister/daughter Agnes (Christina Crivici). Billy later goes insane and murders his mother and her lover, disfiguring Agnes before being caught and sent to an insane asylum. Years later, an adult Billy (Robert Mann) escapes and goes on a rampage with Agnes (Dean Friss) at their old family home, which has been converted into a sorority house. After murdering most of the inhabitants, both Agnes and Billy are killed by Kelli Presley (Katie Cassidy), the sole survivor.

Concept and creation

Development 

Billy was created by Roy Moore, with further contributions to the character by Bob Clark and Timothy Bond. Partial inspiration for the character was taken from the urban legend of "The Babysitter and the Man Upstairs", which itself is based on the unsolved murder of Janett Christman, who had been babysitting for the Womack family in Columbia, Missouri. The legend would grow in popularity throughout the years, before it had become widespread during the 1970s. Although the story has slight variations, the basic storyline describes a young woman who, while babysitting three children, is tormented by a madman who leaves threatening phone calls, later revealed to be coming from upstairs in the house. The legend would also be the basis for other films including the 1979 film When a Stranger Calls, and its subsequent remake. In a 2020 interview with actor Nick Mancuso, it was revealed that additional inspiration for the character was drawn from a series of murders that occurred during the 1943 holiday season in the Westmount area of Montreal, in which a 14-year-old boy bludgeoned several of his family members to death.

Clark and Bond would further develop both the story and the character in subsequent rewrites of Moore's completed first draft, which was then titled Stop Me. Clark was adamant that the character should remain as obscure as possible, feeling that the character was more terrifying if the least amount of information was revealed about Billy and his motivations. Clark would reveal in an interview that, although he never intended to fully reveal the character, he admitted that Billy does have a very subtle backstory, which explained the motivations behind the character's actions and the phone calls he makes in the film. Clark worked closely with cameraman Bert Dunk to create shots that obscured the character as much as possible, this included using lighting techniques to "shape the shadows" cast by Billy, making him look slender in some scenes and burly in another so as to distort the audience's perception of the character. Clark intentionally played upon the mystery of the character's identity, creating the allusion that Claire's boyfriend Chris was in fact Billy, only to reveal in the film's conclusion as a red herring, with Billy still at large. Once distribution rights for the film were purchased by Warner Brothers, studio executives requested that Clark make significant changes to the character's identity, as they disliked the film's ambiguous conclusion. During preparation in 1975 for the film's American release, studio executives suggested that Clark alter the film's ending to reveal the character's identity as Chris, in a proposed scene where Chris appears in front of Jess, the film's final girl, telling her to "[not] tell Agnes what we did" before killing her.  Clark however, was able to convince the studio to retain the original ending, in which both the ending and the character remained ambiguous.

In Glen Morgan's 2006 remake, Billy's enigmatic nature was abandoned for a greater physical presence. Morgan had intended to rework elements of the original film that were left ambiguous or implied, such as the cryptic phone calls to the sorority house. Morgan, a huge admirer of the original film, wanted to create a more defined version of Billy, as well as revealing more of the character's traits. He also wanted to explore sub-plots from the original film that he felt were not fleshed out, including Billy's history and the reasons for his insanity.  Morgan thus created subplot exploring the origins of Billy revealing the connection between Billy and Anges, the film's secondary antagonist. Morgan was inspired by the life of Edmund Kemper, a real-life serial killer who as a child had been locked in the basement of his home by his mother, whom he later murdered. According to Morgan, he and producer James Wong had various disputes with Dimension Films executives Bob and Harvey Weinstein. In a 2014 interview Morgan said his original intention was to have only Billy as the film's only antagonist, but the studio forced him to include a second killer.

Billy was originally intended to have survived at the end, with the original conclusion having Kelli and Leigh, who thought he was dead, in the hospital getting a phone call from him. Bob Weinstein, who disliked the original ending, scrapped it shortly after the scene was filmed, and requested that Morgan write and shoot a new one, which radically altered the fates of many of the characters. In it, Billy is ultimately killed after being impaled on the hospital's Christmas tree-topper.

Name 
The character is commonly referred to by fans and some media outlets as Billy, from his regular mentions of the name during his obscene calls in the original, and the film's final scene, where he refers to himself as "Billy". In the end credits, he is unnamed, and the sorority sisters call him "The Moaner". Several of the original film's cast members, including Clark himself have referred to the character as either "Billy" or simply "The Killer" in interviews. For the 2006 remake, the character was formally named William "Billy" Edward Lenz, and given a sister/daughter Agnes, in reference to the original film's obscene calls where those names are mentioned several times.

Actors 

In the original film, Billy was played by multiple actors. Point-of-view shots of the character were performed by Clark, who also contributed the voice. The scene shot from Billy's point of view, where Billy scales the house and enters the attic, was done by Dunk using a custom-made camera rig attached to his shoulder, the rig allowed Dunk to keep both his hands free to perform the various actions during these sequences. Dunk also portrayed the character in the POV scene where Billy murders Clare, using this same technique. Scenes that required Billy to be shown on screen, an unknown actor was utilized, though members of the cast and crew have failed to recall the name of the actor who portrayed the character during these scenes. One scene in particular, where Billy peers through the crack in the door, Clark himself has admitted to having no recollection to who portrayed the character during the scene. Dunk suggested that Keir Dullea, who portrayed Peter in the film, was used in the sequence and was fitted with a special contact lens, however Dulla has denied this claim leaving the identity of the actor unknown.

For the character's voice during the obscene phone calls, multiple actors were used including Clark, and Italian-Canadian actor Nick Mancuso, in his feature film debut. In the 2002 documentary Black Christmas Revisited, which was included in the collector's edition DVD of the original film, Clark revealed that a total of five separate actors were used to voice the character in various sequences. When auditioning for the role, director Clark had Mancuso sit in a chair facing away from him, so as not to see the actor's face. Clark then had Mancuso experiment with different voices in order to come up with one that was right for the character, which got Mancuso the part. He spent three days recording dialogue for the character, recalling the experience as being "very avant-garde", with Clark encouraging him to improvise in the character's voice. During some of these sessions, Mancuso stood on his head to compress his thorax, making his voice sound more demented. Carl Zittrer, who composed the film's soundtrack and audio, later recalled that Mancuso brought such a 'chilling intensity' to the role while performing the voice for the character, one that he had never seen before or since. Mancuso would later reprise the role in the 2015 DVD and Blu-ray special edition, voicing the character as a part of the release's additional commentary track.

Robert Mann was hired to portray the character in the 2006 remake. Likening the character to a "time bomb", Mann felt that the character harbored a long-boiling rage due to the severe abuse he suffered, leaving the character incapable of expressing any emotions other than rage.

Characteristics 

In both the original and the 2006 remake, Billy is depicted as mentally disturbed, and sexually perverted. Unlike many slasher film villains, Billy's true identity and motivations are never revealed in the original; his appearances are mostly offscreen. Film scholar Adam Rockoff notes Billy's actions and motivations are never explored in a way that would "rationalize or justify his madness", with insanity his defining trait. This lack of physical presence and identity would lead behavioral scientist and psychiatrist Sharon Packer and art historian Jody Pennington to classify the original's Billy as a "faceless killer". Film historian Martin Rubin noted parallels between the character and the shark from Jaws, both of whom are a remorseless, near omnipresent and omniscient force. 

Some writers have argued that Billy, unlike the more popular slasher villains, is defined by his grounding in reality. This realistic approach to the character was noted by John Saxon, who portrayed Lt. Fuller in the original film,  who felt that Billy had a "naturalistic basis" rather than a supernatural one, representing the darkest part of humanity "tormented and was capable of committing horrific [acts]". As Bud Wilkins of Slant Magazine would note, the main attribute that distinguished Billy from the more traditional slasher villains, such as Halloweens Michael Myers, was that Billy represented a more human killer as opposed to what he called "the unstoppable boogeyman that Michael Myers represents". This sense of realism for the character was noticed by some film critics, for the online publication IndieWire,  Jamie Righetti pointed out that Billy's obscene phone calls, "ma[de] it clear that some horrors are all too common, and don't require a boogeyman in a mask."  Filmmaker and literary critic John Kenneth Muir felt that part of Billy's effectiveness during the phone calls was due in part to their believability, drawing parallels between the phone calls and crank calling. The parallel was also echoed by film historian Marc Olivier, who referred to the character as a "psychopathic prank caller", attributing the phone Billy uses as an extension of the character, representing what he called, "the primordial terror hidden in the device itself".

Some writers have noted that Billy's lack of a clear backstory in the original film had forced the audience to place their own fears on the character. As Paul Corupe wrote, "Lacking a distinct form or personality, Billy's really anything you want him to be." Brian Collins of Birth.Movies.Death echoed this sentiment, noting that by leaving so many questions unanswered, the original invites viewers to try and solve the mystery of Billy. Pointing out Clark's statement on the character, in which he purportedly revealed Billy and Agnes as siblings, and Billy's dialogue hinting at something horrible which occurred in the character's past. Film journalist Hannah Shaw-Williams stated that leaving Billy's true identity, backstory, and motivation ambiguous, she noted, made the film more interesting.

With this absence of any clear motivations, some have offered their own suggestions for the reasons behind Billy's actions. Thrillists Jourdain Searles the character represented a critique of toxic masculinity, calling the character "more metaphor than man, an unstoppable, unexplainable personification of masculine id with a singular purpose: to kill all the pretty women." Searles also noted that Billy's dialogue hinted at a deep-seated fury towards women, which seemed to emerge in their presence. In her analysis of the original film, Lauren Taylor of Bloody Disgusting would delve deeper into the character's psychology. Billy's obsessive rambling about Agnes and a baby, Taylor asserts, hinted at a real or imaginary event where the character failed to protect a loved one, further exemplifying the original film's themes of motherhood. Further  clues to the motivation behind Billy's killing spree, Taylor would note, could be found within the victims themselves, all of whom displayed negative characteristics associated with motherhood, such as promiscuity, negligence, and lack of responsibility. With this Taylor concluded that Billy's motivation could possibly be linked to this and the holiday season itself, with his killing spree being the character's way of 'ridding the world of sinners'. 

For the 2006 remake, writer and director Glen Morgan wanted a more defined killer, abandoning the original character's ambiguity in favor of a more traditional slasher villain. As author and film critic Jason Zinoman noted, Billy's lack of backstory was altered by Morgan for the remake, with the film going "back in time" to reveal the character's identity and motivations. In the remake it is revealed that Billy was born with severe jaundice, which turned his skin yellow. Billy's insanity was also explained as being the result of severe abuse at the hands of his mother, leading to the birth of his sister/daughter after being raped by his mother.

Robert Mann, who portrayed the adult character in the remake, felt that Billy's abuse at the hands of his mother created a long-suppressed rage that threatened to emerge at any moment and Billy's moments of extreme violence came from that long-boiling hatred stemming from years of abuse. Mann also felt that this severe abuse and isolation left Billy incapable of dealing with his emotions, with the anger being an expression of the character's sadness, which Mann felt was Billy's true feelings. Morgan stated that the character's motivations arise from their twisted definitions of love and family, which Billy equated with violence after witnessing his father's murder, and the years of maternal abuse he suffered. Morgan went on to reveal that Billy's acts of cannibalism were, in the character's view, a way of "showing his love to them".

Art and cultural historian Berit Åström explained that many aspects of the character in the remake, including his backstory and motivations, mirrored that of Norman Bates in Alfred Hitchcock's Psycho, noting both characters have Oedipus complexes toward their abusive mothers. Åström further explained that both eventually committed matricide. Several critics, including admirers of the original film, would criticize the remake's exploration of the character's backstory as being generic, and less frightening. In her book Life Lessons from Slasher Films, Jessica Robinson argued that the remake's extensive backstory for the character was an attempt by the filmmakers to elicit sympathy for the character.

Legacy 
Since his first appearance in the original film, Billy has been credited by several critics and film historians as establishing many of the tropes that later became a staple for the slasher film genre, such as the image of the "faceless killer", predating John Carpenter's Halloween. They also noted that both Billy and Black Christmas have been largely overshadowed by more popular slasher film entries and villains.

Several critics have noted that Halloween was possibly inspired and influenced by Clark's film and its antagonist. Clark himself has stated that Carpenter might have drawn partial inspiration for Carpenter's film after a conversation about what a possible sequel to Black Christmas might look like. However, Clark also admitted that this may or may not have been the case, and Carpenter himself denied 'borrowing' anything from Clark's film, noting that Halloween was not originally his idea. Many aspects of Billy, including his threatening phone calls, would be utilized in many other slasher films and characters. Complexs Matt Barone pointed out that Scream franchise's Ghostface killer, who uses the same method of phoning his victims, would not have existed if not for Black Christmas and Billy.

Billy has been listed in several media publications as one of the greatest horror film villains of all time. In 2017, GamesRadar included the character in their "30 Cruelest Horror Movie Villains". Daniel Kurland from Bloody Disgusting included the character in his list of "The 10 Best Non-Monster Horror Villains", calling him "the prototypical slasher villain".

The character has been referenced in several other entertainment media. In the 2006 mockumentary slasher film Behind the Mask: The Rise of Leslie Vernon, the title character was mentored by a "retired" killer named Eugene. According to writer David J. Stieve, the character was written as both a homage and an allusion to Billy, pointing out allusions to the character by stating that both characters helped "pioneer the business of fear", but were not as widely recognized as much as their successors. In earlier drafts of the film's script, Eugene was heavily implied to be Billy, but the idea was later abandoned in subsequent drafts in favor of making the character a combination of various slasher villains. Billy also appeared in Season 2 of the flash cartoon parody series 30-Second Bunnies Theatre. Billy would make an appearance in the 2021 fan film It's me, Billy, written and directed by Dave McRae and Bruce Dale. The short, an unofficial sequel to the original film, is set nearly fifty years after the events of the original film. The premise centered on Sam, the granddaughter of Jess Bradford, as she visits her grandmother's old country mansion with her friends and begins to receive frightening phone calls from Billy. Billy was voiced by McRae and portrayed by Bryan Charles Peter.

The character would not appear in the 2019 remake, instead the character was replaced by a cult of misogynistic killers. According to the film's director Sophia Takal, the original version of the character was symbolic of what she claimed was "all the misogyny and sexism implicated against women". Wanting to further convey this theme, Takal reinterpreted the character as a cult rather than a single killer. In spite of not appearing in the film, co-writer April Wolfe revealed that the fight scene at the end of the film, where the main characters use Christmas decorations as weapons, was a direct reference to Billy's murders in the original film. The decision to remove Billy from the film was unpopular both with critics and fans of the original. As one critic wrote, the character's "terrifying ambiguous threat" had been replaced by what they called a more "explicit and hackneyed embodiment of the patriarchy itself".

See also 
 List of horror film villains

Notes

References

Citations

Sources

Books

Websites and media

Further reading 
 
 
 
 
 
 

Black Christmas (film series)
Child characters in film
Christmas characters
Fictional cannibals
Fictional characters from Massachusetts
Fictional characters involved in incest
Fictional characters with disfigurements
Fictional characters with psychiatric disorders
Fictional mass murderers
Fictional matricides
Fictional rampage and spree killers
Fictional serial killers
Fictional stalkers
Film characters introduced in 1974
Male horror film villains
Unseen characters
Slasher film antagonists